Warwick David Fleury is a New Zealand sailor who has competed in eight America's Cups.

He competed with New Zealand Challenge in the 1987, 1988 and 1992 America's Cup campaigns.

Fleury was a trimmer with Team New Zealand during their successful 1995 America's Cup campaign and 2000 America's Cup defence.

Fleury joined Alinghi and was part of their 2003 America's Cup victory, 2007 America's Cup defence and 2010 America's Cup loss. In 2010 he was inducted into the America's Cup Hall of Fame.

He sailed with Ken Read, Daryl Wislang, Kelvin Harrap and James Spithill on board Comanche in the 2015 Sydney to Hobart Yacht Race.

References

Living people
New Zealand male sailors (sport)
1995 America's Cup sailors
2000 America's Cup sailors
2003 America's Cup sailors
2007 America's Cup sailors
2010 America's Cup sailors
Team New Zealand sailors
Alinghi sailors
1987 America's Cup sailors
1988 America's Cup sailors
1992 America's Cup sailors
Year of birth missing (living people)